Gassing can mean:
 Emitting gas
 Gassing (battery), destructive gas generation in batteries
 Gassing (textile process), passing newly spun yarn through a flame to remove the loose fibre ends
 Harming or killing with gas, see Poison gas
 Gassing, prison slang for throwing feces or other bodily fluids at someone
 Talking diffusely or profusely
 Places in Austria
 Gassing, Frauenstein, Austria 
 Gassing, Sankt Lorenzen im Mürztal